Testosterone formate, also known as testosterone carboxylate or testosterone methanoate, as well as androst-4-en-17β-ol-3-one 17β-formate, is a synthetic, steroidal androgen and an androgen ester – specifically, the C17β formate ester of testosterone – which was first synthesized in the 1930s and was never marketed.

See also
 List of androgen esters § Testosterone esters

References

Abandoned drugs
Androgens and anabolic steroids
Androstanes
Formate esters
Prodrugs
Testosterone esters